Timo Scholz (born 30 June 1972 in Leipzig) is a German former cyclist.

Major results

Road
Source:

1995
 1st Overall Bayern Rundfahrt
 2nd Overall Sachsen Tour
 3rd Overall Thüringen Rundfahrt der U23
1997
 1st Overall Thüringen Rundfahrt der U23
1999
 1st Rund um Sebnitz
 3rd Rund um die Nürnberger Altstadt
2000
 1st Stage 3 Vuelta a Costa Rica
2001
 2nd Overall Flèche du Sud
 2nd Overall Brandenburg-Rundfahrt
 4th Overall Sachsen Tour
2002
 1st Overall Brandenburg-Rundfahrt
1st Stage 1
 1st Stage 8 Vuelta a Cuba
 10th Overall Sachsen Tour
2003
 9th GP Triberg-Schwarzwald
2004
 7th Overall Herald Sun Tour
2007
 1st Stage 1B Tour du Maroc
2008
 2nd Tobago Cycling Classic
2009
 3rd Tobago Cycling Classic
 10th Overall Tour of Thailand
2012
 3rd Overall Tour de Ijen
1st  Points classification
 4th Overall Le Tour de Filipinas
 7th Overall Tour of Vietnam
 10th Overall Tour de Borneo

Track

1997
 1st  National Team Pursuit Championships (with Holger Roth, Jens Lehmann and Thomas Liese)
2006
 3rd European Middle Distance Championships
2007
 1st  European Middle Distance Championships
2008
 1st  European Middle Distance Championships
 1st  National Middle Distance Championships
2009
 1st  National Derny Championships
2011
 1st  National Derny Championships

References 

German male cyclists
1972 births
Living people
Sportspeople from Leipzig
People from Bezirk Leipzig
Cyclists from Saxony